The Arena Zagreb is a multi-purpose indoor arena located in Zagreb, Croatia. The site also includes a building complex, the Arena Complex (Arena Center), making it one of the largest shopping-entertainment centers in the city. The arena is used for hockey, futsal, handball, athletics, basketball, volleyball, numerous other sporting competitions, and various concerts, exhibitions, fairs, conventions, and congresses. Arena Zagreb is a member of the European Arenas Association (EAA).

The shopping center and Arena Zagreb share a series of services such as a joint parking lot, multiplex cinema, wellness center, numerous restaurants, cafes, and stores.

History
The Croatian Government and the Zagreb Assembly held a public tender for the construction of a sports hall in order to host games in the 2009 World Men's Handball Championship, and later for numerous other sporting, cultural, and business events. The arena will host the World Men's Handball Championship again in 2025 with the country, Denmark and Norway.

They selected the consortium composed of property developers TriGránit (from Hungary) and Ingra (from Croatia). The TriGránit/Ingra offer was initially approved on 25 April 2007, but the signing of the final contract was delayed because of Mayor Milan Bandić expressing discontent with the conditions. The Consortium engaged studio UPI-2M from Zagreb as well as studio Decathlon from Athens as an international consultant, specially for this project to create and produce a unique design for Arena Zagreb. The construction of the sports hall finally started on 20 July 2007, and was completed as planned on 15 December 2008.

The arena also hosted the 2018 European Men's Handball Championship with Split, Varaždin and Poreč.

Architecture

Resembling a giant rib cage around the building, 86 large pre-stressed, pre-fabricated concrete curved columns form the main façade, connected by a semi-translucent polycarbonate envelope that allows for various light effects. It's one of the landmarks of Zagreb already, along with the cathedral.

Developing spatial and functional characteristics to enable maximum flexibility of the venue was vital during the schematic design stage. The telescopic system of 4,550 seats was a critical element in allowing different configurations and quick turnaround between events. The singular vision also led to provision of spacious facilities for athletes, other performers and event managers, a concept for simple and fluid visitor circulation, a mix of catering facilities and designing in smaller, mutually independent zones that could all be used at the same time. Getting the acoustics right was important too. The steel roof structure had sufficient bearing capacity to enable the suspension of additional stage equipment. The roof structure is close to the structure of a suspension bridge, which is an uncommon approach (in arena design) anywhere in the world. The roof’s bearing structure is only 45 cm high, over a span of 110 m, because it is suspended from the upper side of the roof outside and can not be seen from the interior. This solution was made feasible by contemporary cable production technology – the span is suspended on cables that have a diameter of just 66 mm. Each cable can carry 400 tons. The capacity of the hall is 16,500 seats and 22,400 for concerts.

Arena Zagreb won the Structural Design of the Year award at the 2009 World Architecture Festival, and Grand spectacle award at Global BBR 2010.

Concerts and events

 Beyoncé Knowles held a sold-out concert of her The Mrs. Carter Show World Tour, promoting the album 4 (Beyoncé Knowles album). Croatian singer Franka Batelić was the Opening Act (17 April 2013)
 Mark Knopfler had a concert promoting his album Privateering (album) (5 May 2013)
 Severina Vučković held a concert as a part of her Dobrodošao u Klub Tour. Promoting her twelfth studio album Dobrodošao u Klub (11 May 2013)
 Iron Maiden held a full house concert as a part of their Maiden England World Tour (31 July 2013)
 We Will Rock You (musical) took place, performing in total of 3 shows (25–26 May 2013)

Gallery

See also
 List of indoor arenas in Croatia
 List of indoor arenas in Europe
 List of tennis stadiums by capacity
 List of European ice hockey arenas

References

External links

  

Indoor arenas in Croatia
Handball venues in Croatia
Basketball venues in Croatia
Sports venues in Zagreb
Arena Zagreb
Sports venues completed in 2008
Arena Zagreb
Arena Zagreb
Kontinental Hockey League venues
2008 establishments in Croatia
2016 Davis Cup